The 1999–2000 Magyar Kupa (English: Hungarian Cup) was the 61st season of Hungary's annual knock-out cup football competition.

Quarter-finals

|}

Semi-finals

|}

Final

See also
 1999–2000 Nemzeti Bajnokság I

References

External links
 Official site 
 soccerway.com

1999–2000 in Hungarian football
1999–2000 domestic association football cups
1999-2000